Monte Perdido (in Spanish; Mont Perdu in French; Mont Perdito in Aragonese;all four meaning lost mountain) is the third highest mountain in the Pyrenees. The summit of Monte Perdido (3355 m), located in Spain, lies hidden from France by the seemingly impenetrable peaks of the Cirques of Gavarnie and Estaubé. It stands in the north of Huesca province. The mountain forms part of the Monte Perdido Range and is located in the Ordesa y Monte Perdido National Park, in the western part of the Pyrenees, in the community of Aragon, Spain.

Description 
Monte Perdido Glacier, located on the north-facing slope of Monte Perdido, is the third-largest glacier in the Pyrenees. It is surrounded by vertical cliffs up to 800m in height. Similar to most European glaciers, the Monte Perdido Glacier has been shrinking since the Little Ice Age, and since 1981, the glacier has lost 48 hectares of surface area. The rate of retreat is continuing to accelerate due to the effects of global climate change.

Access to the mountain is easier from Spain than from France. The route starts near the village of Torla, Aragon, at the Ordesa Valley and ascends the Cirque de Soaso towards the Refuge of Góriz before the stiff climb to the summit. It is a dangerous climb with snow.

National park 
Monte Perdido is the centrepiece of the Spanish Ordesa y Monte Perdido National Park which was established in 1918 with just 21 square kilometres/hectares of land. In the 1970s work began to build a dam in the nearby Añisclo Canyon with the objective of creating hydroelectric energy but institutions and citizens demonstrated against this and succeeded in stopping it. In 1982 the park was expanded significantly to 156 square kilometres/hectares and now incorporates the whole of the Añisclo Canyon. There are more than 1,500 species of flowers, 171 species of birds, 32 different mammals and 8 types of reptile in the Ordesa. Among these is the lammergeier (bearded vulture) with a 3-metre wingspan. The Pyrenees is one of the few places in Europe where these birds can be seen.

Because of its imposing landforms, the national park was inscribed on the UNESCO World Heritage List in 1997 as part of the Pyrénées – Mont Perdu World Heritage Site.

See also
List of mountains in Aragon
List of Pyrenean three-thousanders

References

External links
  Normal route and Escaleras route to climb Monte Perdido komandokroketa.org, retrieved 2013-08-20
  "Glaciar de Monte Perdido - Gavarnie and Monte Perdido Massif" swisseduc.ch, retrieved 2013-08-20

Mountains of Aragon
Mountains of the Pyrenees
Pyrenean three-thousanders
World Heritage Sites in France
Mountains partially in France
Tourist attractions in Occitania (administrative region)
World Heritage Sites in Spain